Alexander was the Dean of Wells between 1180 and 1204.

References

Deans of Wells
12th-century English people
13th-century English people
12th-century English clergy